Mulazim Hussain is a Pakistani singer, songwriter and music producer from Rawalpindi who is signed to Coke Studio.

Life and career  
Hussain was born in Rawalpindi, Pakistan. He always wanted to be a singer. In an interview, he said that "I am a jolly person and I am so excited about competing against Indian contestants". He is seen in the Pakistani and Indian reality show Sur Kshetra on Geo TV in which he is selected for the finalist with other Pakistani contestant Sara Raza Khan and Nabeel Shaukat Ali.

Television

References

External links 
 

Pakistani male singers
Pakistani ghazal singers
20th-century births
People from Rawalpindi
Living people
Year of birth missing (living people)